Vir pri Stični is a settlement in the Municipality of Ivančna Gorica in central Slovenia. It lies southeast of Stična in the historical region of Lower Carniola. The municipality is now included in the Central Slovenia Statistical Region.

Name
The name of the settlement was changed from Vir to Vir pri Stični in 1953.

Cultural heritage
A Late Bronze Age to Early Iron Age hill fort with its associated burial ground of over 130 burial mounds has been identified near the settlement.

References

External links
Vir pri Stični on Geopedia

Populated places in the Municipality of Ivančna Gorica